Florica Grecescu (born 31 August 1932) is a Romanian middle-distance runner. She competed in the women's 800 metres at the 1960 Summer Olympics.

References

1932 births
Living people
Athletes (track and field) at the 1960 Summer Olympics
Romanian female middle-distance runners
Olympic athletes of Romania
Place of birth missing (living people)
Universiade silver medalists for Romania
Universiade medalists in athletics (track and field)
Medalists at the 1961 Summer Universiade